Hoher Stein may refer to:

Mountains and hills in

Germany
 Hoher Stein (Thuringian Forest), (860.3 m)
 Hoher Stein (Coswig), (200 m)
Austria
 Hoher Stein (Lower Austria) in the north of Lower Austria in the Bohemian Sass region,

Czech Republic
 German name for the Vysoký kámen, 

Rock formations
 Hoher Stein (Fichtelgebirge) (30 m and ) in the Bavarian Fichtel Mountains
 Hoher Stein (Dresden) in the Dresden suburb of Plauen
 Hoher Stein (Bad Elster) near Bad Elster (Vogtland) in the municipality of Bärenloh 

Other meanings
 Hoher Stein (Anklam), Landwehr tower near Anklam
 Hoher Stein (Ostenholz), monument in Ostenholz after the evacuation of villages to make way for Bergen-Hohne Training Area
 Hoher Stein bei Wachtum, megalithic tomb in the municipality of Lastrup south of the Hümmling
 Hoher Stein (Menhir) near Berga am Kyffhäuser
 Hoher Stein (Rüthen) near Kallenhardt